Dieter-Lebrecht Koch (born 7 January 1953) is a German politician who served as a Member of the European Parliament (MEP) from 1994 until 2019. He is a member of the Christian Democratic Union, part of the European People's Party.

References

Notes

1953 births
Living people
Christian Democratic Union of Germany MEPs
MEPs for Germany 2014–2019
MEPs for Germany 2009–2014
MEPs for Germany 2004–2009
MEPs for Germany 1999–2004
Recipients of the Cross of the Order of Merit of the Federal Republic of Germany